Scarborough North may refer to two electoral districts in Ontario, Canada:

 Scarborough North (electoral district), federal
 Scarborough North (provincial electoral district)

See also
 North Scarborough, an area within the town of Scarborough, Maine, US
 Scarborough (disambiguation)